Rucha Sachin Divekar (born ) is an Indian female artistic gymnast, representing her nation at international competitions. She competed at world championships, including the 2013 World Artistic Gymnastics Championships in Antwerp, Belgium.

References

1995 births
Living people
Indian female artistic gymnasts
Place of birth missing (living people)
Gymnasts at the 2014 Asian Games
Gymnasts at the 2014 Commonwealth Games
21st-century Indian women
21st-century Indian people
Asian Games competitors for India
Commonwealth Games competitors for India